Onekotan (Japanese 温禰古丹島; Onekotan-tō, occasionally Onnekotan-tō) is an uninhabited volcanic island located near the northern end of the Kuril Islands chain in the Sea of Okhotsk in the northwest Pacific Ocean. Its name is derived from the Ainu language for "large village”. It is the second largest island, after Paramushir, in the northern subgroup of the Kurils. It is administratively included in the Severo-Kurilsky District of Sakhalin oblast, Russia.

Geography and geology
It has an area of  

The island consists of two stratovolcanos connected by a relatively flat isthmus.
This volcano was named after Captain Pyotr Krenitsyn of the Imperial Russian Navy. The central peak of this "island within the island" is actually the highest point on Onekotan Island
It has two nested subsidiary calderas, with the cone of Nemo Peak rising in the southwest end of the youngest caldera and a crescent-shaped crater lake, named Lake Chernoye, partially filling the northeast part.

There are seven rivers on the island more than five kilometers long. The largest is Ozernaya River ( long, which flows from the southern part of the caldera of the Nemo volcano to the Sea of Okhotsk. Almost the same length is the Kedrovka River, which flows from the central part of the island into the Pacific Ocean.

The climate of Onekotan is characterized by short, cool summers, high humidity, frequent fogs, and especially strong winds. Even in record cold winters, temperatures below  were not observed.

Onekotan is separated from the neighboring islands by the Fourth Kuril Strait, Yevreinov Strait, and Krenitsyn Strait.

Onekotan still has an active volcano with the most recent eruption, in 1952, forming a small lava dome on the island's coast.
A bay on the eastern shore contains the remains of an abandoned settlement.

Climate

History
Onekotan, with a number of shallow bays and sandy beaching providing landing points, was inhabited by the Ainu prior to European contact. It appears on an official map showing the territories of Matsumae Domain, a feudal domain of Edo period Japan dated 1644, and these holdings were officially confirmed by the Tokugawa shogunate in 1715.

The island was surveyed by Russian geodesists and explorers  Ivan Yevreinov and Fyodor Luzhin in 1720, and was subsequently, claimed by the Empire of Russia in 1736 after the Ainu inhabitants were converted to the Russian Orthodox Church; however Russian tax collectors encountered Japanese officials on the islands in 1744–45.

Sovereignty initially passed to Russia under the terms of the 1855 Treaty of Shimoda, but was returned to the Empire of Japan per the Treaty of Saint Petersburg in 1875 along with the rest of the Kuril islands. The island was formerly administered as part of Shimushu District of Nemuro Subprefecture of Hokkaidō. In 1884, the Ainu inhabitants were relocated by Japanese authorities to Shikotan.

During World War II, the island had a small Japanese garrison, which surrendered on August 25, 1945 without a fight.

After 1945, the island came under the control of the Soviet Union, and is now administered as part of the Sakhalin Oblast of the Russian Federation. A small garrison on the island was withdrawn in 2005.

Flora and fauna

There are chars in Lake Chyornoye, one of the two lakes on Onekotan, located at the northern end of the island.

In the spring and summer pigeon guillemot and Leach's storm petrel nest on the island.

Mammals found on the island include foxes and small rodents, with seals and sea lions on the coast.

The strong winds and harsh climate limit the growth of trees to small thickets of Krummholz formations of Siberian dwarf pine with a maximum height of 2–4 meters, mostly in gullies.

See also

 List of volcanoes in Russia
 List of islands of Russia
 List of islands
 Desert island

Notes

Further reading

 Gorshkov, G. S. Volcanism and the Upper Mantle Investigations in the Kurile Island Arc. Monographs in geoscience. New York: Plenum Press, 1970. 
 Krasheninnikov, Stepan Petrovich, and James Greive. The History of Kamtschatka and the Kurilski Islands, with the Countries Adjacent. Chicago: Quadrangle Books, 1963.
 
 Takahashi, Hideki, and Masahiro Ōhara. Biodiversity and Biogeography of the Kuril Islands and Sakhalin. Bulletin of the Hokkaido University Museum, no. 2-. Sapporo, Japan: Hokkaido University Museum, 2004.

External links

 NASA Earth from Space: Onekotan Island
 Photographs of Onekotan Island
 
 Onekotan - The Lost Island - A movie about 3 Athletes on the lost island Onekotan.

 
Active volcanoes
Islands of the Sea of Okhotsk
Islands of the Russian Far East
Volcanic crater lakes
Stratovolcanoes of Russia
Islands of the Kuril Islands
Uninhabited islands of Russia
Uninhabited islands of the Pacific Ocean
Calderas of Russia
Volcanoes of the Kuril Islands
Mountains of the Kuril Islands